BBC Sessions is a 2004 compilation double album featuring performances by English band The Searchers. All songs were originally broadcast on various BBC Light Programme radio shows from 1964 to 1967. The two-CD set consists of many of the band's hits or album tracks, 30 songs, including six songs which had never been recorded by them in the studio (including Bob Dylan's "Blowin' in the Wind") and 12 tracks of dialogue, mainly handled by drummer and band's spokesman Chris Curtis. The songs are essentially "live in studio" performances.

Overview and recording
Assembled here is every BBC recording by the Searchers that has survived to date.  It was not the BBC's practice to archive either the session tapes or the shows' master tapes and many of them were lost. No releasable tapes of the Tony Jackson era exist, the first included here is from 1964 with Frank Allen on bass guitar and vocals. All sessions are taken from the well-known shows hosted by Brian Matthew: Saturday Club, Top Gear or Saturday Swings. "Brian Matthew always tried to make us feel at home and at ease, as did his producer, Benie Andrews," wrote about recordings Mike Pender in his autobiography.

The Searchers recorded them at one of the BBC's usual locations the Playhouse Theatre, the Paris Theatre or the studio out at Maida Vale. "What usually happened was that we'd have done a gig late the previous night, and then we’d have to go in at 9.30 the next morning to tape the radio session," said guitarist John McNally. Normally there was no soundcheck and no overdubs. Pender agreed: "Some of our performances were not as good as we would have liked, given more time and more technical support."

Track listing

Personnel
The Searchers
 Mike Pender – lead guitar, lead vocals, backing vocals
 John McNally – rhythm guitar, lead and backing vocals
 Frank Allen – bass, lead and backing vocals
 Chris Curtis – drums, lead and backing vocals
 John Blunt – drums (CD 2: 11, 12, 14, 15, 17, 18, 19, 20, 21)

References

2004 compilation albums
The Searchers (band) albums